The following is a list of episodes of the situation comedy television series Samantha Who?. The program premiered on October 15, 2007 in the United States on the American Broadcasting Company (ABC). Created by Don Todd and Cecelia Ahern, Samantha Who? follows the life of Samantha Newly (Christina Applegate) who was hit by a car and now has retrograde amnesia. Samantha Who? began its first season on October 15, 2007 and concluded on May 12, 2008. A second season of the series aired on ABC's 2008–09 schedule from October 13, 2008 to July 23, 2009. A total of 35 original episodes of Samantha Who? were produced over two seasons.

The show's first season was released to Region 1 DVD by ABC Studios and Disney Studios on September 23, 2008. The second season was released to Region 1 DVD on August 25, 2009.

Series overview

Episodes

Season 1 (2007–08)

Season 2 (2008–09)

Weekly ratings

Season 1
 Orange states that this was the highest rated episode of the season.

 Yellow states that this was the lowest rated episode of the season.

Season 2
 Red states that this was the highest rated episode of the season.

 Green states that this was the lowest rated episode of the season.

References
General

Specific

Lists of American sitcom episodes